Denis Rassulov (born 2 January 1990) is a Moldovan football player who currently plays for Zaria Bălți in the Moldovan National Division. He made his debut for the Moldova national football team in 2014.

References

Living people
1990 births
Moldovan footballers
Moldova international footballers
FC Milsami Orhei players
Association football defenders